The range of area codes 300-399 is currently reserved for Colima, Jalisco, Michoacán, Nayarit and Zacatecas. 

(For other areas, see Area codes in Mexico by code).

3